Dino Fazlic (born 21 November 1991) is a German footballer who plays as a midfielder for FC Süderelbe.

Career
As a youth player, Fazlic joined the youth academy of Bundesliga side Werder Bremen but left due to injury and problems with the manager.

In 2011, he joined the youth academy Bolton Wanderers in the English Premier League, where he suffered a hairline fracture and left due to relegation to the second division, before joining Swiss club Grasshoppers. After that, Fazlic almost signed for Chievo in the Italian Serie A and German lower league team SV Wilhelmshaven.

In 2014, he joined the youth academy of Fulham in the English Premier League but left due to change of manager.

Before the second half of the 2014–15 season, Fazlic signed for Croatian First Football League outfit NK Zadar, where he made two league appearances.

In 2015, he signed for Kidderminster Harriers in the English fifth division.

In 2016, Fazlic signed for German fifth division side TB Uphusen.

Before the second half of the 2016–17 season, he signed for VfB Oldenburg in the fourth-tier Regionalliga Nord.

References

External links
 
 

Living people
1991 births
Sportspeople from Banja Luka
German people of Bosnia and Herzegovina descent
German footballers
Association football midfielders
Regionalliga players
Croatian Football League players
NK Zadar players
Halifax Town A.F.C. players
Kidderminster Harriers F.C. players
VfB Oldenburg players
FC Teutonia Ottensen players
National League (English football) players
German expatriate footballers
German expatriate sportspeople in Switzerland
Expatriate footballers in Switzerland
German expatriate sportspeople in Croatia
Expatriate footballers in Croatia
German expatriate sportspeople in England
Expatriate footballers in England